The Finishing School is the last novel written by British author Muriel Spark and published by Viking Press in 2004. It concerns 'College Sunrise', a mixed-sex finishing school in Ouchy on the banks of Lake Geneva near Lausanne in Switzerland.

Plot
The school is run by Rowland Mahler and his wife Nina Parker. Rowland is trying to write a novel but discovers that a new star pupil, Chris Wiley, only seventeen is also writing a novel, which eclipses Rowland's efforts.  Frustrated by his own inability to make progress, and increasingly aware of Chris' prodigious talent, Rowland becomes obsessed with the boy, occasioning dry ironies about twists in human relations. Chris recognises this and keeps his novel under wraps whilst at the same time encourages his attention, increasing Rowland's frustration.

References

External links
the Complete Review

2004 British novels
Novels by Muriel Spark
British novellas
Novels about writers
Novels set in Switzerland
Lausanne
Viking Press books
Lake Geneva
Novels set in schools
Doubleday (publisher) books